Micromyrtus uniovulum is a plant species of the family Myrtaceae endemic to Western Australia.

The shrub is in a small area in the Wheatbelt region of Western Australia between Carnamah, Three Springs and Mingenew.

References

uniovulum
Endemic flora of Western Australia
Myrtales of Australia
Rosids of Western Australia
Vulnerable flora of Australia
Plants described in 2002
Taxa named by Barbara Lynette Rye